Big Chill can refer to:

The Big Chill (music festival), an annual music and comedy festival held in England
The Big Chill (film), a 1983 American film directed by Lawrence Kasdan
The Big Chill at the Big House, a 2010 U.S. college ice hockey game that set an attendance world record
"The Big Chill" (The Batman), an episode from The Batman
Big Chill, an alien character from the animated series Ben 10: Alien Force
A variant of the colloquial term "Big Freeze" for the Heat death of the universe

See also

 The Bigg Chill, a frozen yogurt shop in Westwood, Los Angeles
 Big Freeze (disambiguation)